The Camden International Film Festival, stylized as CIFF, is an annual documentary film festival based in Camden, Rockport, and Rockland, Maine, in the United States that takes place on the last weekend in September.

Created in 2005 by Benjamin Fowlie, the festival highlights craft and innovation within nonfiction storytelling. In addition, CIFF hosts the annual Points North Documentary Forum, a two-day conference that provides documentary filmmakers with opportunities for professional development and creative inspiration. Past participants include representatives from HBO, A&E, the BBC, The New York Times, Discovery, ZDF-Arte, Kickstarter, Vimeo, the Tribeca Institute, the Sundance Institute, Harvard's Berkman Center and MIT's Open Doc Lab.

The festival screens approximately 80 documentary features and shorts annually. Screenings are followed by Q&A sessions with directors and industry professionals. Festivities over the weekend also include a course through the University of Maine, panels, workshops, photographic exhibits, musical concerts, and parties.

References 

https://web.archive.org/web/20090208142013/http://www.downeast.com/Articles-2007/A-Camden-International-Film-Festival-First/
https://web.archive.org/web/20090208145644/http://newenglandfilm.com/news/archives/05october/camden.htm
https://web.archive.org/web/20080915070642/http://www.umaine.edu/news/article.asp?id_no=2270
https://web.archive.org/web/20090208092007/http://imaginenews.com/Archive/2005/SEP_2005/PAGE12.htm
http://waldo.villagesoup.com/AandE/story.cfm?storyID=144826

External links

Camden, Maine
Documentary film festivals in the United States
Film festivals in Maine
Tourist attractions in Knox County, Maine